Davy Claude Angan N'Guessan (born September 20, 1987) is an Ivorian footballer who plays as a winger or forward for Kuala Lumpur Rovers in the Malaysia M3 League.

Career 
Born in Abidjan, he played for Entente Sportive de Bingerville, before his transfer to Lyn Oslo in 2008. He signed for Hønefoss BK in 2010.

On  12 January 2011, he was transferred to Molde FK, and became Ole Gunnar Solskjær's second signing for the club. The transfer fee is estimated to be around 4,000,000 NOK.

Angan was sold to Chinese Super League club Hangzhou Greentown on 26 January 2013 for 12,000,000 NOK.

In August 2016, Angan joined Gaziantepspor on loan from Hangzhou Greentown, with a view to a permanent deal.

On 23 May 2019, he joined Melaka United during the 2019 Malaysian Super League mid-season transfer window.

Career statistics

Honours

Club
 Molde
 Tippeligaen: 2011, 2012

Individual

Performances
 Molde top scorer: 22 goals in 2012

References

External links
 
 Lyn Statistics
 Profile at Lyn.no 
 

1987 births
Living people
Ivorian footballers
Ivorian expatriate footballers
ES Bingerville players
Molde FK players
Hønefoss BK players
Lyn Fotball players
Zhejiang Professional F.C. players
Gaziantepspor footballers
Samsunspor footballers
Mosta F.C. players
Melaka United F.C. players
Eliteserien players
Chinese Super League players
Süper Lig players
TFF First League players
Maltese Premier League players
Malaysia Super League players
Footballers from Abidjan
Association football forwards
Expatriate footballers in Norway
Expatriate footballers in China
Expatriate footballers in Turkey
Expatriate footballers in Malta
Expatriate footballers in Malaysia
Ivorian expatriate sportspeople in Norway
Ivorian expatriate sportspeople in China
Ivorian expatriate sportspeople in Turkey
Ivorian expatriate sportspeople in Malaysia